was a Japanese actress. She appeared in more than 30 films between 1948 and 1985.

Selected filmography
 Dedication of the Great Buddha (1952)
 Epitome (1953)
 Life of a Woman (1953)
 An Actress (1956)
 The Hole (1957)
 Night Drum (1958)
 Farewell to the Land (1982)
 The Mad Fox (1962)

References

External links

1923 births
2002 deaths
Japanese film actresses